"Things fall apart" is a short quotation from William Butler Yeats' poem "The Second Coming" (1920). Most other usages borrow from the poem:

 Things Fall Apart, a 1958 novel by Nigerian author Chinua Achebe
 "Things Fall Apart", a 1981 holiday single by Cristina
Things Fall Apart (album), 1999 album by the hip hop band The Roots
"Things Fall Apart" (The West Wing), 2005 episode from the TV show The West Wing
"Things Fall Apart" (Ugly Betty), 2009 episode from the TV show Ugly Betty
"Things Fall Apart", a song by Built to Spill on the album There Is No Enemy (2009)
"Things Fall Apart", band (2011-2016)  Columbus, OH 
All Things Fall Apart, 2011 film starring 50 Cent
 Things Falling Apart, a 2000 remix album by Nine Inch Nails